Plesiomma is a genus of robber flies in the family Asilidae. There are at least 20 described species in Plesiomma.

Species
These 20 species belong to the genus Plesiomma:

 Plesiomma angustum Macquart, 1848
 Plesiomma atrum Bromley, 1929
 Plesiomma caedens (Wiedemann, 1828)
 Plesiomma caminarium (Wiedemann, 1828)
 Plesiomma darlingtoni Hull
 Plesiomma ferrugineum (Macquart, 1838)
 Plesiomma fuliginosum (Wiedemann, 1821)
 Plesiomma funestum Loew, 1861
 Plesiomma haemorrhoum (Fabricius, 1805)
 Plesiomma indecorum Loew, 1866
 Plesiomma inflatum Hull, 1962
 Plesiomma jungens Schiner, 1867
 Plesiomma leptogastrum Loew, 1866
 Plesiomma lineatum (Fabricius, 1781)
 Plesiomma salti Bromley, 1929
 Plesiomma semirufum (Wiedemann, 1828)
 Plesiomma sepia Hull, 1962
 Plesiomma simile Scarbrough & Perez-Gelabert, 2006
 Plesiomma testaceum Macquart, 1838
 Plesiomma unicolor Loew, 1866

References

Further reading

 
 
 

Asilidae
Articles created by Qbugbot